Brian Timothy Rimpf (born February 11, 1981) is a former American football offensive tackle. He was drafted by the Baltimore Ravens in the seventh round of the 2004 NFL Draft. He played college football at East Carolina.

Rimpf also played for the New Orleans VooDoo and California Redwoods.

Rimpf is a former teacher and head football coach at Jack Britt High School in Fayetteville, North Carolina. He is now the head coach and athletic director at Camden High School in South Carolina.

Early years
Rimpf played high school football at Leesville Road High School in Raleigh.
He was taught principles of business and business law at Harnett Central High School in Angier, North Carolina.

College career
Rimpf played college football at East Carolina University where he was First-team All Conference USA twelve times in his career.

Professional career

Baltimore Ravens
Played 2004-2006

New Orleans VooDoo
Rimpf played for the New Orleans VooDoo of the Arena Football League in 2008, recording one tackle.

California Redwoods
Rimpf was drafted by the California Redwoods of the United Football League in the UFL Premiere Season Draft in 2009. He signed with the team on September 2.

References

External links
Just Sports Stats
United Football League bio

1981 births
Living people
Players of American football from Raleigh, North Carolina
American football offensive tackles
American football offensive guards
East Carolina Pirates football players
Baltimore Ravens players
New Orleans VooDoo players
Sacramento Mountain Lions players
Leesville Road High School alumni